Victoria Adukwei Bulley  is a British-born Ghanaian poet.

Early life and education

Bulley is of Ghanaian heritage, born and brought up in Essex, England.  In 2019 she was awarded a Techne scholarship for doctoral work at Royal Holloway, University of London.

Writing

Her debut pamphlet Girl B was published by Akashic Books and included in the collection New-Generation African Poets: A Chapbook Box Set.  Karen McCarthy Woolf called it "a probing, thoughtful, and quietly exhilarating debut".

Her first book collection Quiet (2022) was praised in the TLS as "clever and capacious poems". and described in The Guardian as "mark[ing] the arrival of a major poetic talent".

Her writing has been published in works including Rising stars : new young voices in poetry (Otter-Barry Books, 2107), Ten: poets of the new generation (Bloodaxe Books, 2017),  Granta, The Guardian, and The White Review.

She produced the Mother Tongues intergenerational project, in which poets worked with their mothers to translate their poetry into their mother-tongues.

Recognition
Bulley won a 2018 Eric Gregory Award.

Quiet was shortlisted for the 2022 T. S. Eliot Prize and the 2023 Folio Prize.

Selected publications

References

External links

Author profile on Faber website
Interview, 2022 with Poetry London

Year of birth missing (living people)
Living people
Ghanaian poets
English people of Ghanaian descent
Writers from Essex
Black British writers
Black British women writers